Qatrun, Al Katrun, Gatrone, or Al Gatrun is a village in the Murzuq District in southern Libya on the main road to Chad and Niger.  It has a filling station (gas station) and a Niger consulate office is located there. When the border checkpoint 310 kilometres south at Tumu is closed, travelers crossing into Libya from Niger report in at Qatrun.

The town was briefly captured by the National Liberation Army during the Libyan Civil War in July 2011. On 23 July, Gaddafi forces recaptured the city and continued south towards Al Wigh. The National Liberation Army later recaptured the village.

External links
Satellite map of al-Qatrun at Maplandia.com

References

Populated places in Murzuq District
Baladiyat of Libya